Gawalise Stadium is a stadium in Palu, Central Sulawesi, Indonesia. The stadium the home of Persipal Palu and Celebest FC. It has a seating capacity of 20,000, the stadium category is C+. It is located in the southern part of the city close to the mountain range.

See also
 List of stadiums in Indonesia
 List of stadiums by capacity

References

palu
Football venues in Indonesia
Sports venues in Indonesia
Buildings and structures in Central Sulawesi
Post-independence architecture of Indonesia
Sport in Central Sulawesi